Mary Mendum may refer to:

Mary Mendum (botanist), British botanist
Mary Mendum, American pornographic actress known by the stage name Rebecca Brooke